The 1930 season was Klubi i Futbollit Tirana's first competitive season in a major competition, which was the National Championship. The club won the championship and were crowned the inaugural champions of Albania. Two of the club's players Rexhep Maçi and Emil Hajnali were the season's top goalscorers with 3 goals each.

References 

1930
Albanian football clubs 1930 season
Albanian football championship-winning seasons